Goh Cheng Liang (born 1927) is a Singaporean billionaire businessman who founded Wuthelam Holdings, which manufactures paint and coatings.

Early life
Goh Cheng Liang was born in Singapore. He is the son of Wu Songchang and Li Xiuying.

He grew up in poverty and sold fishnets and rubber tapper for income. After World War II, he began buying cheap paint from the British army which he turned into a local company.

Career
He set up his first paint shop there in Singapore in 1955, and became the main distributor there for Nippon Paint in 1962. Wuthelam Holdings, which has interests in the paint business and property development, was founded in 1974 as a real estate concern.

In 2020, his son Goh Hup Jin helped conclude a deal which enabled Wuthelam Holdings to formally take control of Nippon paint. The merger added approximately $3.8bn to his overall networth. According to Forbes, his net worth stands at $18.6 billion as of 2021, making him the second richest person in Singapore.

Personal life
Goh Cheng Liang lives in Singapore. His Goh Foundation has made large donations to several charitable causes.

He has a son, Goh Hup Jin, who has been the chairman of Nippon Paint since March 2018 and runs their privately held joint venture, Nipsea.

References

1920s births
Living people
Singaporean businesspeople
Singaporean billionaires
Singaporean people of Chinese descent
Singaporean people of Teochew descent